Waterford County Council was the authority responsible for local government in County Waterford, Ireland. The remit of Waterford County Council also included some suburbs of the Waterford city not within the remit of Waterford City Council. As a county council, it was governed by the Local Government Act 2001. 

When disestablished in 2014, the council was responsible for housing and community, roads and transportation, urban planning and development, amenity and culture, and environment. It had 23 elected members. Elections were held every five years and were by single transferable vote. The head of the council had the title of Mayor. The county administration was headed by a County Manager. The county town was Dungarvan.

Origins
Waterford County Council was one of those created by the Local Government (Ireland) Act 1898, an Act of the Westminster parliament. It took over the administrative business until then dealt with by the county grand jury, such as the maintenance of highways and bridges, the upkeep and inspection of lunatic asylums, and the appointment of coroners. The new county council also took over some duties of the poor law boards of guardians and of the justices of the peace to regulate explosives.

The county was divided by the Local Government Board for Ireland into district electoral divisions, each returning one councillor for a three-year term. The urban district of Waterford also elected county councillors, and "additional members" included the chairman of each rural district in the county, unless already elected or disqualified, when the RDC was to appoint another member. The council could also co-opt one or two additional members for a three-year term.

The first county council elections were held on 6 April 1899, and the first business was to appoint additional members. Waterford County Council held its first meeting in Waterford Courthouse, but agreed that later meetings would be held at Dungarvan Courthouse. 

The county council established a County Secretary's Office at Arus Brugha at Davitt's Quay in the early-20th century before moving into the modern Civic Offices, Dungarvan, at Davitt's Quay in 1999.

The triennial elections were postponed in 1914, on the outbreak of the First World War.

Proportional representation, 1919
The Local Government (Ireland) Act, 1919 introduced proportional representation to county councils: all councillors were to be elected by single transferable vote from multi-member electoral areas. There was only one election under the new system, held in January 1920 (in urban areas) and on 2 June 1920 (in rural areas), during the Irish War of Independence.

Merger with Waterford City Council
In late 2012, the Minister for the Environment, Community and Local Government Phil Hogan announced the proposed merger of Waterford County Council and Waterford City Council. It was abolished in June 2014 when the Local Government Reform Act 2014 was implemented. It was succeeded by Waterford City and County Council.

In 2009, the county was divided into four local electoral areas: Comeragh (6), Dungarvan (6), Lismore (4) and Tramore (7).

References

Politics of County Waterford
Former local authorities in the Republic of Ireland
2014 disestablishments in Ireland